The third season of Brazil's Next Top Model, a reality show hosted by model Fernanda Motta, was filmed from July to August 2009 and premiered on September 10, 2009. The show aims to find the next top fashion model. The winner received a contract, management and representation by Ford Models, a photo shoot for the cover and a six-page spread within Gloss magazine, participation in a campaign of C&A and Intimus, an English course in Ireland, a holiday in Paris, France and a R$100,000 contract with Expor cosmetics.

The season features 13 contestants and the winner was 20-year-old Camila Trindade from Porto Alegre, Rio Grande do Sul.

Cast

Contestants
(Ages stated are at start of contest)

Judges
 Fernanda Motta (host)
 Erika Palomino
 Dudu Bertholini
 Duda Molinos

Other cast members
 Carlos Pazetto 
 Namie Wihby

Episodes
Aired: September 10, 2009

The series starts with a special episode featuring interviews with the cast and the winner of season 2, Maíra Vieira.

Special Guest: Maíra Vieira

Episode 1 
First aired: Sept. 17, 2009

The 20 semi-finalists came to São Paulo, where they met Fernanda Motta and her panel of judges. During the interviews, Cris was called and eliminated. Bruna, who is diabetic, had a nervous breakdown and was taken to a doctor. The first photo shoot was a group photo with all the contestants. This time were eliminated Barbara, Kinda and Alexandra. After the meeting, Hanays leaves the competition, claiming missing her boyfriend. Ultimately, Esther and Yasmin were eliminated and the top thirteen girls settle for congratulating Fernanda.

Featured Photographer: Miro

Episode 2
First Aired: September 24, 2009

Now is the time for the 13 finalists to get to know the house of their dreams. Before starting the activities, the girls go through the physical evaluation. Bruna claims her body is swollen because of diabetes, but other models report that Bruna overate.

Namie Wihby makes the first catwalk workshop and gives a drastic verdict: the group has the worst runway of all seasons. Despite the difficulties, the models face their first challenge: runway on top of a building, using a sock and a wig covering their faces. Camila S. wins the challenge and 10 pairs of sandals "Melissa".

The girls return to the catwalk where Pazetto explains that they will have to walk with three different looks: teen style, androgen and hottie. The show also features an extra difficulty for the participants, they will be observed by judges and special guests.

Back to the house, Liana and Rafaela again pull the ear of the other girls on the cleaning of the kitchen. A Fernanda Mail explains to the models that whoever was called first would have her  picture displayed in the house permanently.

At panel, the judges congratulate Camila S. for the result of her photos and also the catwalk, but Camila T. was called first. In the end, Jéssyca and Liana landed in the bottom two and Jéssyca was eliminated.

First call-out: Camila Trindade
Bottom two: Jéssyca Schamne & Liana Góes
Eliminated: Jéssyca Schamne
Featured photographers: Márcia Fasoli, Zé Takahashi
Special guests: Daniele Pavan Araujo (model), Clóvis Pessoa (Ford Models booker)

Episode 3
First Aired: October 1, 2009

It's time for makeovers. The invited hair stylist was Mauro Freire. Tom Tow (Jude Law's, Coldplay's and Agyness Deyn's hair stylist) also appeared to help to give a new fresh-look to the girls. Bruna complains about her makeover, which causes the other girls to question her professionalism.

For the photo shoot this week, the girls pose in lingeries with male models in a bed. Giovahnna is praised for bringing out a feminine side of her, but Camilla S., Fabi, Bia and Liana fall flat.

At panel, the judges are really impressed by Mírian's transformation, and great photo, while Bruna was confronted for her behavior during the makeovers, despite producing a beautiful picture. Mírian was called first, while Camilla S. and Liana landed in the bottom two, the former for not being photogenic, and the later for looking old and not fulfilling the brief. In the end, Liana was eliminated.

First call-out: Mírian Araújo
Bottom two: Camila Shiratori & Liana Góes
Eliminated: Liana Góes
Featured photographer: Eduardo Rezende
Special guests: Thomas Taw and Mauro Freire (stylist), Marina Moraes (Gardenia Restaurant's chef), David Pollak (stylist), Lavousier (make up artist), Tiago Gass, Alex Schultz, Rodrigo Calazans and Felipe Terra (models)

Episode 4
First Aired: October 8, 2009

After coming back from judging, Tati announces that she would like to leave the competition, since she misses her family. Tati calls her cousin, who criticizes her behavior, and tells her to stay in the competition until the end. This gives Tati the drive to continue on, as she announces that she'll only leave when the judges eliminate her.

The girls participate in a workshop with Kaká Moraes, a renowned make-up artist. Kaká gives every girls tips about what kind of make-up looks better on them. After the workshop, the girls participate in a challenge: Do their own make-up in 20 minutes with products from Avon. Bia's make-up is considered to be the worst; Julliana and Tati are praised for their looks, but Bruna is the challenge winner, as her make-up looks very model-like. As a prize, she'll go in a dinner in a Japanese restaurant, but she needs to choose one girl who will not go. Bruna chooses Bia, as she did the worst, even though Rafaela says that Bruna doesn't like Bia in the first place.

In the restaurant, Bruna has a meltdown because of her diabetes: She says people are always making her think about the disease, even though she doesn't want to think about it. The girls think she just wants attention.

For the photo shoot, the girls are doing a beauty shot, with very over the top head-pieces. Bruna, Camila S. and Giovahnna are considered the best of the day. In judging, the judges are impressed by Bruna's performance during the whole week, winning the challenge and producing the best picture. The judges also wonder if Camila S.'s picture this week was a fluke, since it is so much better than the one in the previous week.

Bruna gets called first, and Rafa and Fabi are in the bottom two: Rafa because the judges think she's not ready for this competition, and Fabi because she only had one good photo. Fernanda gives the last photo to Fabi, as Rafa is eliminated.

First call-out: Bruna Brito
Bottom two: Fabi Teodoro & Rafa Xavier
Eliminated: Rafa Xavier
Featured photographer: Debby Gram
Special guests: Kaká Moraes (Avon's make up artist), Gabriella Araujo e Dani Delameri (Gloss magazine's editor)

Episode 5
First Aired: October 15, 2009

First call-out: Bia Fernandes
Bottom two: Camila Shiratori & Giovahnna Ziegler
Eliminated: Camila Shiratori

Episode 6
First Aired: October 22, 2009

First call-out: Tati Domingues
Bottom two: Giovahnna Ziegler & Rafaela Machado
Eliminated: Rafaela Machado

Episode 7
First Aired: October 29, 2009

The episode starts with the girls praising Tati for winning the previous week's challenge, and Tati saying she was so angry at Giovahnna being spared and Rafaela eliminated that she couldn't cry. The girls then meet up with Pazzetto for this week's workshop, which is cumulative with Namie's runway lesson. The girls are supposed to learn how to undress a coat elegantly in the runway. Giovahnna struggles, with Namie criticizing her for walking poorly in heels. Tati is also criticized for trying to escape the challenge, with Namie saying she's not fooling him, only herself.

Afterwards, the girls meet up with an actress to learn how to show skin and being sexy without being over the top. The challenge is to walk down the runway while undressing, and drop all the clothes on a trunk. Bruna struggles, while Fabi shines, and she is rewarded with 50% more frames for the week's photo shoot. She also picks one of the girls to have 50% less frames for the shoot, and she chooses Mírian.

In the house, Bruna comments on how she is bloated thanks to her diabetes, but she believes she is getting slimmer. Camila T. and Tati mention that she's not bloated because of the diabetes, but because of the sweets she eats locked up in the bathroom. The girls also criticize Giovahnna for her mood swings. Bia talks about her pregnancy, and Bruna calls her family and cries saying the other girls are being mean to her because of her diabetes.

In the photo shoot, Mírian produces a stellar photo despite having only 15 frames. Fabi struggles, and so does Bia. At judging, Namie praises Giovahnna for her soft facial expression, but says he wants to die whenever he sees her walking in high heels. Erika tells Bia she has to work harder and not rely only on her beautiful eyes. Dudu and Fernanda criticize Bruna for her enlarging figure (she gained 7 centimeters on her hips since the start of the season) and warn her that her only competition is actually herself and not the other girls. In the end, Giovahnna is sent because the judges don't feel she's improving.

First call-out: Julliana Aniceto
Bottom two: Camila Trindade & Giovahnna Ziegler
Eliminated: Giovahnna Ziegler

Episode 8
First Aired: November 5, 2009

First call-out: Bruna Brito
Bottom two: Tati Domingues & Fabi Teodoro
Eliminated: Fabi Teodoro

Episode 9
First Aired: November 12, 2009

First call-out: Tati Domingues
Bottom two: Mírian Araújo & Julliana Aniceto
Eliminated: Julliana Aniceto

Episode 10
First Aired: November 19, 2009

First call-out: Bruna Brito
Bottom two: Mírian Araújo & Bia Fernandes
Eliminated: Bia Fernandes

Episode 11
First Aired: November 26, 2009

First call-out: Camila Trindade
Bottom Two: Mírian Araújo & Tati Domingues
Eliminated: Tati Domingues
Featured photographer:  Rafael Assef
Special guests: José Gayegos (fashion designer), Eugênia Fleury (model), Maíra Vieira (Season 2 winner)

Episode 12
First Aired: December 3, 2009

This will be the recap episode. It will aired right before the finale, and will feature never-before-seen footage.

Episode 13
First Aired: December 3, 2009

The season concludes as the final three hopefuls girls walk the runway in a fashion show attended by the industry elite. Then, one girl is eliminated.

First call-out: Camila Trindade
Bottom two: Bruna Brito & Mírian Araújo
Eliminated: Mírian Araújo

The final two models compete in a Gloss magazine photo shoot. The winner is announced at the final judging ceremony.
 
Final two: Bruna Brito & Camila Trindade
Brazil's Next Top Model: Camila Trindade
Featured photographer: Vavá Ribeiro
Special guests: Marco Aurélio (Ford Models), Lena (Gloss magazine editor), André Lima (fashion designer)

Results

 The contestant was eliminated
 The contestant won the competition

Notes

References
 Official website 

Brazil
2009 Brazilian television seasons
2009 Brazilian television series endings
Television shows filmed in São Paulo (state)

th:บราซิลเน็กซต์ท็อปโมเดล ฤดูกาลที่ 2